Denise Cooper (born 20 July 1960) is an Australian sprint and marathon canoeist who competed in the early 1990s. She finished eighth in the K-4 500 m event at the 1992 Summer Olympics in Barcelona.

She also won with Gayle Mayes the 1988 world championship in doubles (K2) over the marathon distance, and repeated her success in 1994 winning the same event again with Shelley Jesney as a partner.

References
Sports-Reference.com profile
World Championship Marathon Race Results 1994
World Championship Marathon Race Results 1988
Australian Canoeing World Championship medal results

1960 births
Australian female canoeists
Canoeists at the 1992 Summer Olympics
Living people
Olympic canoeists of Australia